This is a list of children's animated television series (including internet television series); that is, animated programs originally targeted towards audiences aged 12 and under in mind.

This list does not include Japanese, Chinese, or Korean series, as children's animation is much more common in these regions.

1960s

United States

Co-productions

References

Childrens
animated
Childrens 1960s
Children's animated series
 1960s